James Wollaston (1873 – December 1918) was an English footballer who played in the Football Alliance for Small Heath. Wollaston was born in the Hall Green district of Birmingham and played local football before spending a few weeks with Small Heath at the end of the 1890–91 season. He played in three friendlies and once in the Football Alliance, standing in at right half for Harry Morris, though his preferred position was centre half. He died in Kings Norton, Birmingham, in 1918 aged about 45.

References

1873 births
1918 deaths
Footballers from Birmingham, West Midlands
English footballers
Association football wing halves
Birmingham City F.C. players
Football Alliance players
Date of birth missing